Two ships of the United States Navy have been named Ballard, after Edward J. Ballard.

 , a small galley sold in 1816.
 , a Clemson-class destroyer commissioned in 1919 and decommissioned in 1945.

Sources
 

United States Navy ship names